The 2010–11 Algerian Ligue Professionnelle 1 was the 49th season of the Algerian Ligue Professionnelle 1 since its establishment in 1962. A total of 16 teams contested the league, with MC Alger as the defending champions. The league started on September 24, 2010. and ended on July 8, 2011.

On June 21, 2011, ASO Chlef were officially crowned champions after second-placed CR Belouizdad lost to USM El Harrach. In doing so, they won their first Algerian league title in the club's history. At the bottom, USM Annaba, CA Bordj Bou Arréridj and USM Blida were relegated to the Algerian Ligue Professionnelle 2.

Overview 
At the start of the season, the name of the league was changed to Ligue Professionnelle 1 from Algerian Championnat National to reflect the professionalization of the league.

Promotion and relegation 
Teams promoted from 2009–10 Algerian Championnat National 2
 MC Saïda

Teams relegated to 2010–11 Algerian Ligue Professionnelle 2
 CA Batna
 MSP Batna
 NA Hussein Dey

Team summaries

Stadiums

Personnel and kits

Note: Flags indicate national team as has been defined under FIFA eligibility rules. Players and Managers may hold more than one non-FIFA nationality.

Managerial changes

League table

Results

Season statistics

Top scorers

See also
 2010–11 Algerian Ligue Professionnelle 2
 2010–11 Algerian Cup

References

External links
Awards at YouTube

Algerian Ligue Professionnelle 1 seasons
Algeria
1